Cyllecoris ernsti is a species of bug in Miridae family that is endemic to Crete.

References

Insects described in 2006
Hemiptera of Europe
Endemic arthropods of Crete
Orthotylini